Controlling the Famous was a Los Angeles, California-based indie rock band formed in 2001. After signing with The Militia Group, the band recorded the album Automatic City, which was released on May 16, 2006. The band split up in 2007.

History
The band was formed in 2001 by college students and neighbors Max Hellmann (guitar, vocals), Johnny Collins (guitar, vocals), and Brendan Hughes (bass guitar). After parting ways with their original drummer, Louis Laoudis, the band recruited drummer Mike Schneider in 2004.  Their first release was the EPMaybe It Won't Kill You, But Probably It Might in 2002. A split EP with Operatic in 2003 was followed by another self-released EP, Two Birds vs. One Stone, in 2005. The band then signed to The Militia Group in October 2005 and began working on their debut album, Automatic City, with producer Alex Newport. The album was released in May 2006. The album received generally positive reviews, with Allmusic writer Corey Apar giving it four stars, and calling it "a consistently enjoyable listen", with Alternative Press writer Emily Zemler giving it the same score and describing it "as jagged and propulsive as any post-punk/hardcore album in recent memory". PopMatters writer Evan Sawdey gave the album five out of ten, calling it "a mixture of highs and lows".

In October 2006  the band went on hiatus, and after briefly working together in early 2007, announced that they had split up in February.

Members of Controlling the Famous have moved onto new bands in the Los Angeles area. Drummer Mike Schneider now produces music as Barstool Astronaut, and Max Hellmann played guitar in the bands Handshakes and Hotel for Strangers, with members of the defunct bands Wintergreen and Sputnik Monroe.

Members
Brendan Hughes (bass guitar)
Johnny Collins (vocals/guitar)
Max Hellmann (vocals/guitar)
Mike Schneider (drums)

Other members
Louis Laoudis (drums)
Tony Ostrowski (keyboards)

Discography
 The Magnet EP (EP) 2002
 Maybe It Won't Kill You, But Probably It Might (EP) 2002
 We Are Bounty Hunters for Hire (EP) 2003
 Two Birds vs. One Stone (EP) 2005
 Automatic City (album) 2006

References

External links
Soundcrank Podcast Hosted by Controlling the Famous
Rare music video of Controlling the Famous playing at Scolari's Office.
details on Handshakes featuring Max Hellmann (vocals/guitar).

Indie rock musical groups from California
Musical groups from Los Angeles
Musical groups established in 2001